José Luis Manzano (born March 9, 1956) is an Argentine businessman and former politician. He is currently a partner in the second largest multimedia group in his country, Grupo América, and has investments in several economic sectors, including energy, wine, and clothing. During his time in Argentine politics, Manzano was known as a power broker and negotiator and one of the architects of the success of the Menem government. 

Manzano holds a medical degree and completed postgraduate work in the United States. Early in his career, he served in Argentina's Congress, later serving as in the cabinet of President Carlos Saúl Menem.  

In 1996 Manzano formed the powerful media group, Grupo América, which quickly grew to its spot today as the second largest media company in Argentina. The firm owns 49 media outlets from all over Argentina and includes radio, TV, digital content, and graphics. 

Manzano owns businesses in other sectors including oil and gas. He also serves as the president of Integra Capital, an international investment firm. Manzano is an experienced investor and frequently speaks around the world on issues such as investment, media, energy and distressed industries, according to the firm.

Education and academic activities
A doctor by professional education, José Luis Manzano graduated with a medical degree from the National University of Cuyo, specializing in occupational health. He later lived in the United States and was a visiting scholar at both Georgetown University and the University of California, San Diego. He has lectured at prestigious universities in Argentina, Japan, Europe and the United States and has received several international awards.

He is also president of the Postgraduates Foundation of the Congress, in Mendoza, where he was a former member of its administration board.

Business activities
Manzano owns and runs a number of businesses in a variety of industries. He often travels around the world, speaking at conferences and panels.

During the COVID-19 global pandemic, Manzano spoke out against protectionism, predicting it would make the world's economy worse off. To heal the international economic crisis caused by the pandemic, Manzano advised that countries increase international trade, remarks he gave as a guest panelist at a panel on international trade hosted by the International Economic Forum of the Americas. Manzano also expressed support for government intervention and support of small and medium-sized businesses, but also called on businesses to adapt. "Those who are not prepared to adapt properly to this new reality will not be able to survive," he said (translated from Spanish).

Integra Capital 
Among the businesses that Manzano owns is Integra Capital, a financial services and investment company. The company is bullish in the energy and mining sectors, responsible for putting together large investment funds for projects in these industries. For example, Integra invested in the Golfo San Jorge Basin, a sedimentary basin hydrocarbon-rich area located in eastern Patagonia. Pipelines, electricity generation, and industrial- and personal-use water projects are also within the company's scope of investments. In the power sector, Integra put together a large investment program of nearly $100 million dedicated to modernization and creation of an intelligent grid.

Media
Resettling in Argentina in 1996, Manzano and entrepreneur Daniel Vila created UNO Medios, also known as Grupo Uno (Group One) or Group Vila-Manzano. They also established Supercanal Holding AS, now valued at more than $800 million.

Grupo Uno acquired the Buenos Aires-based TV channel América 2, in partnership with the politician and businessman Francisco de Narvaez. Manzano and Vila developed Grupo Uno into the second-largest media group in Argentina. By the end of the 90s, it controlled the principal channels of the Cuyo region: Channel 7 (Mendoza), Channel 8 (San Juan) and Channel 6 (San Rafael). Today Grupo Uno consists of 40 media outlets throughout the country, including press, radio, television, and digital enterprises. Among the major channels is América 2, located in Buenos Aires, whose operation license was renewed during President Néstor Kirchner's administration. Through all of its media outlets, Grupo Uno reaches around 25 million people in Argentina. In addition, it is also a service supplier of Triple Play (a provider of telephone, Internet and cable television services) through the company Supercanal. Some 450,000 people in 14 Argentinian provinces subscribe to its services.

The Vila-Manzano group also bought into cable operations abroad. In 1977 it acquired 25% of Procono in Spain, and in 1997 formed Supercanal Cable Spain. The group also purchased VVC, Alvarez & Alvarez, Video Selimn, MEG, Electro Audio and Imagem Teresopolis, CATV Sat LITD, and Televisao Spectrum Systems, all in Brazil. In addition, the group owns cable operations in Bolivia and owns Dominican Supercanal in the Dominican Republic. The group owns or has owned part of the magazine Primera Fila, the newspapers La Capital de Rosario and New Time, Paraná, and various radio stations.

Grupo Uno has 28 licenses between AM, FM and open television broadcasting. Manzano and Vila control channel América and its cable TV channel América24, La Red radio and newspaper networks including La Capital del Rosario and Diario UNO in Entre Rios, Mendoza and Santa Fe. With its extensive network of media services, the company reaches about 25 million people in Argentina and thus constitutes the second largest multimedia group in the country.

As one of the key owners of Grupo Uno, Manzano led the partnership with China Watch, a media outlet of news and analysis about China's business, society and culture. China Watch became the first Spanish-spoken media about China.

Holdings
As of 2001, the Vila-Manzano group, through Supercanal Holding SA and other firms, controlled the following cable-TV enterprises in the locations indicated:

Buenos Aires: Rawson Cable SA,*Tucumán: Monteros Televisora Color Mercedes SRL,ACV Cable Visión SRL,ART TV SA,AT Sat SRL,Aconquija Televisora Satelital SRL,Antena Comunitaria SA,Arlink SA
Catamarca: TV Cable Catamarca SA
Córdoba: Telesat,Inversora Antena Comunitaria Trelew SA,Inversora Atelco Comodoro SA,Lules Cable Color,Mirror Holding SRL,Nueva Visión Satelital SRL,Nuevo Horizonte SRL,Patagonia on Line SA,Pehuenche Cable Televisora Color SRL,SCH SA,SHO SA,SMR SA,San Luis Cable SA
La Rioja: TV Cable La Rioja SA,Comunicaciones Austral SA,DTH SA,Etemsa SA,Facundo TV SA,General Levalle,Horizonte SRL,ICC
Mendoza: Trinidad Televisión SA,Atelco SA,Cable Televisora Color SRL,Cabledifusión SA,Cablesur SA,Carolina Cable Color SA
Río Negro: BTC SA,Sucanal SRL,TTV SA,TV Cable Chilecito,Tajamar Sistemas Electrónicos,Telecable SA,Telesur SRL,Transcable SA,Vicuña Mackenna TV,Visión Codificada SA
San M. de los Andes: San Martín de los Andes Televisora Color SA.,lntegra Cable SRL
San Juan: Televisora del Oeste SA
San Luis: Cable Televisora Color Mercedes SRL
Santa Cruz: Cable Max SA
Santiago del Estero: Tele Imagen Codificada SA
Tierra del Fuego: Televisora Austral SA

The group also owns or has owned the magazine Primera Fila, in Mendoza; the daily newspapers La Capital and El Ciudadano, Rosario; el periódico Nueva Hora de Paraná; Canal 7 in Mendoza, Canal 8, Radio AM Calingasta and Radio FM Nuestra, in San Juan; Megavisión SA (Siempre Mujer) and Radio Rivadavia, among others.

Energy and oil
Manzano and Vila are also leaders in the electricity sector through Edemsa, a private-public company that provides electricity to Mendoza province. The two men created Andes Energía, a Latin American energy group dedicated to the exploration, development and production of conventional and non-conventional oil and gas. The company operates in Argentina with 24 licenses. In Colombia, it currently has 11 licenses for oil investments. The company is listed on the stock exchanges in London and Buenos Aires, and is part of an operating holding company with subsidiaries including Kilwer, Ketsal, Grecoil and Interoil.

In July 2017, Andes Energía merged with Petrolera El Trebol (PETSA), an Argentine subsidiary of Switzerland's Mercuria. The merger created the new company Phoenix Global Resources and it has a strong presence in the country's most prolific conventional and non-conventional oil basins. Its main objective is the development of the Vaca Muerta field in both Neuquén and Mendoza.

Manzano and Vila managed to close an agreement between the Andes and Mercuria, one of the largest hydrocarbon traders in the world, consisting of two loans totaling $60 million (USD), the first of which will allow it to settle a debt of US$20 million to finance drilling activities in Chachaheun, Argentina, and the second is a US$40 million credit line to finance drilling activities throughout the Andes portfolio, including its Vaca Muerta, Argentina surface.

In addition, Manzano has investments in the oil sector through the firm Ketsal/Kilwer. Within the last few years, the business has been awarded exploitation contracts in southern Argentina, an area of great oil extraction potential.

Manzano and Vila also control Hidroeléctrica Ameghino S.A. (an electricity generating plant) in Chubut Province. The plant is connected to the Patagonic Electric System and provides an annual 174 Gwh of electricity.

In 2013, Vila and Manzano bought 49.9% of the UTE (Transitory Union of Companies) led by El Trebol to exploit the Chañares Herrados and Puesto Pozo Cercado deposits in Tupungato (concessioned until 2017). The operation was carried out with Mercuria, the holding company owner of El Trébol. They signed an agreement with a Brazilian oil company named Imetame Energia to explore their fields in Brazil.

Building 
Manzano also works with Vila in the construction industry through their industrial construction company Pamar SA, which specializes in building gas pipelines and has more than 35 years of experience in the market. Pamar works in Latin American countries creating oil and gas pipelines, process plants, electricity distribution networks, fiber optic networks and sanitation works. Pamar S.A. was recognized as the leader of the "Central West Gas Pipeline System", the largest of its kind in Argentina, covering more than 500 kilometers. Its biggest customers are YPF, TGS, TGN and EDEMSA.

The Vila-Manzano group became part of Metrogas, after British Gas (BG) agreed to sell its holdings to the company Integra Gas Distribution LLC, owned by the Mendoza holding company. Integra is the second largest shareholder (17% of total shares) of the company after YPF.

Metrogas distributes more than 19% of the total gas supplied in the country and is the only gas distribution service provider in and around Buenos Aires. It covers more than 2,150 square kilometers and has 15,800 kilometers of pipeline. It has more than 2.3 million customers.

Wine production 
In 1998, Manzano entered the wine industry. He created Grupo Vitivinícola de Tupungato, which operates Los Algarrobos estate in San Juan, and vineyards and a winery in Tupungato, Mendoza.

The winery owns 1,533 hectares of fields which are located around 1,200–1,500 meters above sea level. Thirty hectares are taken up by vineyards, which produce raw materials for the wines that are sold in domestic and foreign markets. The winery has an output capacity of 1 million liters of wine per year.

In the same building as the winery is a restaurant known as La Tupiña in Gualtallary, owned by the Viticulture Group of Tupungato.

Political activities
Earlier in his career, Manzano was active in Argentine politics. He served as Secretary General of the Peronist and was an elected member the National Congress. Manzano quickly rose through the ranks to become the majority leader from 1983 to 1991. President Carlos Menem appointed Manzano to his cabinet, where he served as Homeland Security Minister. On August 12, 1991, he was appointed the Ministry of the Interior.

He was known as a power broker who other members had to go through to get anything done. He is credited with helping pass economic reforms (the opening of the economy) and government reforms during the Menem administration. 

Manzano was a founder and an active member of the Peronist ("La Renovación Peronista") political party. When democracy returned to Argentina, the party was defeated at the ballot box, after which Manzano helped consolidate and strengthen the party. One source describes him as "the symbol of the late-80s renewal of Peronism."

During his political career, Manzano was first vice president, and then president, of the Deputies Block of the Justicialist Party (PJ).

In 1983 he was the Argentine national deputy. As a member of the Chamber of Deputies of the nation, he participated in the approval of the legislative bill on the modification of the civil marriage regime, being one of the main speakers of the discussion sessions prior to the final sanction of Law 23,515 (Divorce Law) in 1987.

"Responsible liberty" 

During his time in politics, Manzano spoke out in support of personal responsibility and individual liberties, which he called "responsible liberty."

He defended the practice of people marrying after separation, and this defense coupled with his support of individual liberty was documented in a speech he gave on August 19, 1986, where he affirmed his belief in the importance of responsible liberty:"We want adult liberty, responsible freedom for the Argentines, and that those who want to re-bet on love and family, instead of having the comfortable situation of separation without assuming responsibilities, to assume together with Argentine society these two issues, that we do not understand separated because in the justicialismo we learned to live them together: freedom and responsibility (...) When we speak of liberation, we are referring to the fact that as a nation and as a people each of us has to opt for more things every day, that every day he must make the renunciation that he must make to his individual freedom in order to build together collective freedom.
He also referred to the importance of consensus for the country. "When they say that it is not possible, we will say that it can. And that day, when we finish learning the lesson that the motor is the consensus, what better is to close the ears to the lobbyists and open them to the clearest voices of Argentine society – those who come from the people, the only legitimate source – we can together rediscover many things (...) And then we can rediscover together that dreaming is not crazy and that dreams are possible."In 1991, as Minister of the Interior and leader of the federal security forces, he played a key role in investigating the abduction of the businessman Mauricio Macri.

In 2008 Manzano was honored in Argentina's parliament (the National Congress of Argentina) along with other former members for helping to reconstruct Argentina's returning democracy.

United States
From 1993 to 1995 Manzano lived in California where he began to develop his career in the private sector acting as an international consultant. He lived in Washington, D.C in 1994 where he joined the Republican Party. In 1995, he studied English and American domestic policy at the University of San Diego, and created a consulting firm called Integra Investments S.A., where he serves as the company's president. Integra Investments has offices in Washington, Miami, Buenos Aires and Mendoza. In late 1995, after spending two years away from Argentina, he returned home with plans of pursuing a business career.

Social responsibility 
José Luis Manzano contributes to social, cultural and educational causes. He works with the Vendimia Solidaria program, which works toward the development of children and adolescents in the Province of Mendoza by providing financial assistance and promoting actions for the benefit of hospitals, neighborhood sports clubs and schools.

He also participates in the La Capital Foundation, a Rosario organization whose objective is to promote and disseminate spaces for cultural production, debate and academic formation and promote volunteering and social responsibility.

Manzano is sponsor of the House of Chinese Culture in Buenos Aires and president of the foundation of the University of Congress. He has also contributed to the Clinton Foundation and to The Climate Reality Project, a foundation founded by former U.S. Vice President Al Gore that seeks to raise awareness about environmental issues such as climate change.

Personal life
On February 21, 2015, José Luis Manzano, who is Christian, married with Teresa Jordan, who is his partner since 2000. The event was held at his estate in Gualtallary, Tupungato.
The businessman has 4 children: Juana Schindler, Silvestre Schindler, Maria de la Paz Manzano and Antonio Jordan.

References 

Argentine Jews
Ministers of Internal Affairs of Argentina
People from Mendoza Province
1956 births
Justicialist Party politicians
Living people